Gábor Vékony (December 15, 1944, Csengőd – June 10, 2004) was a Hungarian historian, archaeologist and linguist, associate professor at Faculty of Humanities of the Eötvös Loránd University, Candidate of Sciences in History. He was an expert of the rovás scripts and a researcher of Hungarian prehistory.

Life and career 
He attended elementary school in Tabdi and secondary school in Kiskőrös. He graduated from the Eötvös Loránd University of Budapest (ELTE) with a degree in archaeology and history in 1968. He obtained his PhD in 1969. From 1968 he worked in the Kuny Domokos Museum in Tata. From 1970 until his death in 2004 he was an associate professor of the Department of Archaeology and the Department of Ancient History at ELTE.

Rovas inscriptions 

Prof. Vékony deciphered several Rovas inscriptions, e.g. Szarvas inscription and Alsószentmihály inscription.

His works 
 1970 Lábatlan-Rózsa Ferenc utca (Komárom m., dorogi j.) RFüz I: 23. 1970. 9.
 1970 Vespasianus-kori építési felirat Aquincumban (Tóth Endre társsz.), Arch. Ért. 97, 109–115.
 1981 Az onogurok és onogundurok a Kárpát-medencében, SzMMÉ
 1982 Das nordwestliche Transdanubien im 9. Jahrhundert und die "Uungariorum marcha", Savaria 15
 1983 Veneter – Urnenfelderkultur – Bernsteinstrasse, Savaria 16
 1983 A gyepű szerepe az etnikai és politikai átalakulásokban, in: Tőkei Ferenc (szerk.) : Nomád társadalmak és államalakulatok (Körösi Csorna kiskönyvtár 18). Budapest 1983, 215–236.
 1986 A Karoling birodalom „délkeleti” határvédelme kérdéséhez, KEMMK 2
 1986 A dák királyság (Mócsy András társsz.), in: Makkai László - Mócsy András (szerk.): Erdély története I. A kezdetektől 1606-ig. Akadémiai Kiadó Budapest, 32–46.
 1987 Spätvölkerwanderungszeitliche Kerbinschriften im Karpatenbecken
 1988 Késő népvándorláskori és Árpád-kori települések Tatabánya-Dózsakertben, in: Gombkötő G. (Főszerk.):Komárom megye története I.
 1989 Dákok, rómaiak, románok. Akadémiai Kiadó, Budapest.
 1997 Protobolgárok a Kárpát-medencében, KEMMK 5
 1999 Komárom-Esztergom megye a honfoglalás korában, Tudományos Füzetek 11
 2000 „A Dunántúl középső bronzkora és kapcsolatai”, KEMMK 7
 2000 A koszideri korszak a Dunántúlon, KEMMK 7
 2000 A Bodrog-alsóbűi felirat, SMK 14
 2002/2005 Magyar őstörténet - Magyar honfoglalás
 2004 A székely írás emlékei, kapcsolatai, története
 2007 A rézkortól a hunokig

Notes

References 
 Mócsy András–Vékony Gábor: A Dák Királyság [The Dacian Kingdom]. In: Erdély rövid története. Budapest 1989 
 Riba,István: Jöttek, honfoglaltak, fújtak. Régészvita egy rovásírásról [Came, settled, blown. Archaeological debate about the runic scripting]. In: Heti Világgazdaság [Weekly Word's Economy], Vol. 21. 1999. N. 46. pp. 101–102, 105
 Riba, István (2000). "Reading the Runes: Evidence of the Dual Conquest?". The Hungarian Quarterly. Vol. XLI. No. 157, Spring 2000
 Hungarian Székelys in the Carpathian Basin before 894 A.D. In: Népszabadság, June 25, 1999.

Hungarian archaeologists
20th-century Hungarian historians
1944 births
2004 deaths
Rovas script
Academic staff of Eötvös Loránd University
20th-century archaeologists